The First Schröder cabinet (German: Kabinett Schröder I) was the 19th Government of Federal Republic of Germany in office from 27 October 1998 until 22 October 2002. It succeeded the Fifth Kohl cabinet formed after the 1998 elections. Gerhard Schröder, Minister President of Lower Saxony, reached an agreement on a coalition with the Alliance 90/The Greens (Greens) and his Social Democratic Party (SPD), setting the stage for Schröder to become Chancellor of Germany. Joschka Fischer (Greens) replaced Klaus Kinkel (FDP) as Vice-Chancellor of Germany and Federal Minister of Foreign Affairs. The cabinet was succeeded by the Second Schröder cabinet.

Composition 

|}

References

Schroder I
1998 establishments in Germany
2002 disestablishments in Germany
Gerhard Schröder
Cabinets established in 1998
Cabinets disestablished in 2002
Schroder I

no:Gerhard Schröders andre regjering
pl:Drugi rząd Gerharda Schrödera
sv:Regeringen Schröder